Tullio De Piscopo (born 24 February 1946 in Naples, Italy) is an Italian drummer, percussionist and singer- songwriter.

De Piscopo was born in Naples. His father was an orchestra percussionist. In 1969 he moved to Turin and two years later he moved to Milan, where he joined the Franco Cerri quintet. He later began a successful career as session drummer, playing with many international artists, including Gerry Mulligan, Chet Baker, Stéphane Grappelli, Massimo Urbani, Gil Evans, Slide Hampton, Don Costa, Tony Scott, Ástor Piazzolla, Aldemaro Romero, Gato Barbieri, Eumir Deodato, Mina, Lucio Dalla, Franco Battiato, Fabrizio De André, Pino Daniele, Manu Chao and others.

Between the 1970s and 1980s, De Piscopo played on several occasions with bassist-arranger Pino Presti, with whom he established one of the top rhythm sessions in the Italian music scene. In 1974 and 1975, he was a member of New Trolls Atomic System. In 1979 De Piscopo played the drums in the album L'era del cinghiale bianco by the singer-songwriter Franco Battiato. The album reached the number one spot in Italy immediately after its publishing.
In 2021, Tullio De Piscopo formed a jazz trio formed by him (drummer/percussionist), Aldo Zunino (bass player), Dado Moroni (pianist) .

De Piscopo released his first solo album, Suonando la batteria moderna, in 1974. One of his most successful songs is "Andamento lento", which won Festivalbar in 1988. His 1983 single, "Stop Bajon (Primavera)" reached No.1 spot in Italy and No.58 in the UK Singles Chart in March 1987. 

His 1985 song "Radio Africa" (written by Lino Nicolosi and Dora Carofiglio) was a collaboration with Guinean singer Mory Kanté. He is also the owner of the record label Bagaria.

He also wrote scores for several movies. Current DragonForce drummer Gee Anzalone was taught by Piscopo at the NAMM Academy in Milan and refers to him as an influence.

Discography
 Suonando la batteria moderna (1974)
 Volume 2 (1975)
 Concerto per un film: L'arma (1978)
 Live (1981)
 Metamorphosis (1981)
 Acqua e viento (1983)
 Passaggio da Oriente (1985)
 Drum Symphony (1986)
 Bello carico (1988)
 Album (1989)
 De Piscopo (1991)
 Cosmopolitana (1993)
 Zzacotturtaic (1995)
 Pasión mediterranea (1997)
 Jazz Friends (2000)
 Live in Zurich at Mood's Club (2004)
 Bona Jurnata (2007)

References

External links
 Official site (note: flash-only)

1946 births
Living people
Musicians from Naples
Italian jazz drummers
Male drummers
Italian pop musicians
Italian session musicians
Italian bandleaders
Italian male singers
Tango musicians
20th-century Italian musicians
21st-century Italian musicians
20th-century drummers
21st-century drummers
20th-century Italian male musicians
21st-century Italian male musicians
Male jazz musicians
Italian drummers